The 2012 edition of the Lebanese FA Cup is the 40th edition to be played. It is the premier knockout tournament for football teams in Lebanon.

The winners qualify for the 2013 AFC Cup.

First qualifying round phase 1

|colspan="3" style="background-color:#99CCCC"|15 October 2011

|}

First qualifying round phase 2

|colspan="3" style="background-color:#99CCCC"|19 October 2011

|}

Second qualifying round

|colspan="3" style="background-color:#99CCCC"|25 October 2011

|-
|colspan="3" style="background-color:#99CCCC"|26 October 2011

|-
|colspan="3" style="background-color:#99CCCC"|1 November 2011

|-
|colspan="3" style="background-color:#99CCCC"|5 November 2011

|}

Third qualifying round

|colspan="3" style="background-color:#99CCCC"|8 December 2011

|-
|colspan="3" style="background-color:#99CCCC"|9 December 2011

|-
|colspan="3" style="background-color:#99CCCC"|10 December 2011

|}

Round of 16

|colspan="3" style="background-color:#99CCCC"|13 January 2012

|-
|colspan="3" style="background-color:#99CCCC"|14 January 2012

|-
|colspan="3" style="background-color:#99CCCC"|15 January 2012

|-
|colspan="3" style="background-color:#99CCCC"|19 January 2012

|-
|colspan="3" style="background-color:#99CCCC"|24 January 2012

|}

Quarter-finals

|colspan="3" style="background-color:#99CCCC"|8 February 2012

|-
|colspan="3" style="background-color:#99CCCC"|15 February 2012

|}

Semi-finals

|colspan="3" style="background-color:#99CCCC"|4 April 2012

|-
|colspan="3" style="background-color:#99CCCC"|29 April 2012

|}

Final

|colspan="3" style="background-color:#99CCCC"|9 May 2012

|}

External links
Soccerway.com

Lebanese FA Cup seasons
Cup
Leb